Henry Warren Rogers (1831-1915) was an American architect practicing during the late nineteenth and early twentieth centuries in Lynn, Massachusetts.

Early life and career
Henry W. Rogers was born November 20, 1831 in Lynn, Massachusetts, to Warren and Elizabeth (Potter) Rogers. He attended the public schools of Lynn and Marshfield, to which town his family moved in 1841. In 1846 he was apprenticed to Isaac Waterman, a shipbuilder of Medford, Massachusetts. In 1853 he instead took up housebuilding, and returned to Lynn in 1855. For some years he was employed as a foreman by Nehemiah Lee. Being responsible for the design of many of the buildings he built, he gradually turned to architecture. In 1879 he formally abandoned carpentry and opened an architect's office in Lynn. By 1882 he had associated himself with his elder son, Hamilton Everett Rogers. After the death of the elder Rogers, Hamilton E. Rogers continued to practice under his father's name until 1917. His own death occurred on December 30, 1920.

Personal life
Rogers was first married to Caroline Augusta Bates (1834-1875) in 1854. She died in 1875, and he remarried in 1880, to Olive Ann Randall (1847-1938) of North Berwick, Maine. Rogers had three children, all with Caroline Augusta: Henrietta Eunice (1855-1919), Hamilton Everett (1857-1920) and Clarence Abel Rogers (1859-1941). Both sons followed him into the architecture profession. Henry Warren Rogers died January 30, 1915.

Rogers was a descendant of one John Rogers, who immigrated to Marshfield, Massachusetts from England in 1635, aboard the Hercules.

Legacy
At least four of Rogers' works have been individually listed on the United States National Register of Historic Places, and others contribute to listed historic districts.

Rogers and his son were responsible for the design of many buildings built after the Great Fire of 1889. Two from this period, the Fabens and Woodbury Buildings, are considered to be the best examples of the Richardsonian Romanesque style in Lynn.

Architectural works

References

Architects from Lynn, Massachusetts
1831 births
1915 deaths